General elections were held in Mexico on 5 July 1970. The presidential elections were won by Luis Echeverría Álvarez, who received 86% of the vote. In the Chamber of Deputies election, the Institutional Revolutionary Party won 178 of the 213 seats, as well as winning all 64 seats in the Senate election. Voter turnout in the legislative elections was 64.4%.

Designation of the PRI presidential candidate
Among the many individuals considered by President Díaz Ordaz to succeed him were Alfonso Corona del Rosal (Head of the Federal District Department), Luis Echeverría Álvarez (Secretary of the Interior) and Emilio Martínez Manatou (Secretary of the Presidency).

According to Jorge G. Castañeda, Díaz Ordaz arrived at a final decision in the aftermath of the 1968 Tlatelolco massacre, in which the Army killed a multitude of unarmed protesters in Mexico City after months of student protests across the country. The massacre was a turning point in Mexican history, and the exact responsibility of the officials involved in it continues to be debated, with many asserting that the Secretary of the Interior, Echeverría, was the one who ordered the troops to shoot at the protesters.

With the 1970 elections ahead, Díaz Ordaz "disqualified" both Corona del Rosal and Martínez Manatou from becoming the PRI presidential candidates: in the former's case, because Díaz Ordaz feared that, in the aftermath of the Tlatelolco massacre, Corona del Rosal would be rejected by the population due to his military background; while in the case of Martínez Manatou, he was seen as too close to the dissident sectors that had been behind the 1968 movement.

Therefore, Díaz Ordaz decided on Echeverría, who didn't have a military background but had unmistakably been a loyal hardliner not just during the events of 1968, but during the entire Díaz Ordaz administration.

In an extraordinary move, during his annual Address to the Congress on 1 September 1969, President Díaz Ordaz assumed the full "personal, ethical, social, judicial, political and historical responsibility" for the government's decisions during the 1968 events. This was interpreted by many as the definitive signal that the President had decided on Echeverría to be his successor, as Díaz Ordaz was assuming complete responsibility for the repression, clearing Echeverría of any culpability. Indeed, two months later, on 8 November 1969 the PRI formally announced that Echeverría would be the party's candidate for the 1970 presidential elections.

Before being nominated as presidential candidate, Echeverría had never held a popularly elected post; he would be the first in a series of PRI presidential candidates (and thus Presidents of Mexico) until 1993, who had never been elected to any office before receiving the presidential nomination.

Campaign
In addition to being nominated by the PRI, Echeverría was also nominated by the Authentic Party of the Mexican Revolution (PARM) and the Popular Socialist Party (PPS), two traditional PRI satellites. The coordinator of the Echeverría campaign was Alfonso Martínez Domínguez, who was also President of the PRI. The only opposition candidate in the presidential race was Efraín González Morfín, a former legislator, nominated by the right-wing National Action Party (PAN)

Whereas Echeverría had been a hardliner during the Díaz Ordaz administration, and had been known as a discreet bureaucrat during his entire career, upon becoming the Presidential candidate he radically changed his image, adopting a populist rhetoric towards the peasants and the students; this was likely to shake off the accusations that he had been responsible for the Tlatelolco massacre. As Enrique Krauze puts it, Echeverría became "immediately obsessed with making people forget that he had ever done it."

A confusing incident on November 1969 (shortly after Echeverría was officially nominated as the PRI presidential candidate) provoked a national controversy and almost led to Echeverría being replaced.
During a visit to the Universidad Michoacana de San Nicolás de Hidalgo (popularly known as the "Nicolaita University"), Echeverría gave an address that had a mixed reception among the students present. Shortly after finishing the address and as the candidate prepared to leave the building, one of the students shouted demanding everyone present to keep a minute of silence in memory of the students massacred in Tlatelolco. Echeverría and his aides were shocked, and he agreed to keep a minute of silence "for the dead, for both the students and the soldiers who died in Tlatelolco", after which the entire audience, including Echeverría, kept the minute of silence.

The military chiefs, including the Secretary of the Defense Marcelino García Barragán, were outraged by the incident and expressed their indignation to president Díaz Ordaz, stating that the Armed Forces would no longer support Echeverría and demanding that he be replaced as the party's candidate. Nonetheless, Díaz Ordaz stood by Echeverría, who the next day gave an address in which he praised the Armed Forces. In early January 1970, Echeverría and García Barragán met at the latter's ranch in Autlán to definitely put aside the conflict.

Traditionally, PRI presidential candidates would undertake extensive tours of the national territory during their campaigns, and Echeverría in particular visited more than 900 towns, was seen in person by 10 million people and traveled more than 56,000 kilometers on his campaign bus, which he named "Miguel Hidalgo" after the independence hero. Echeverría was notorious for usually wearing guayaberas on his tours and campaign rallies.

Echeverría promised that his government would not be "neither to the right nor to the left, but upward and onward". The tensions with the students continued, and on one occasion, Echeverría defended the jailing of the students who had participated in the 1968 protests, stating that no one had been arrested "for writing a novel or a poem or for his way of thinking". Echeverría was also contrary to the implementation of policies to lower the high population growth rate (which was then of 3.5% per year), stating that the size of families was "a private matter for parents to decide" and that it wasn't "a proper area for the state".

There were many songs written for the Echeverría campaign; two of them, "Corrido de Luis Echeverría" and "Arriba y Adelante" were recorded by popular ranchera singer Francisco "Charro" Avitia.

Results

President

By state

Senate

Four other senators from the governing PRI took their seats in a by-election in 1975 to conclude the 1970-1976 term.

Chamber of Deputies

Notes

References

Presidential elections in Mexico
Mexico
General
Legislative elections in Mexico
Election and referendum articles with incomplete results